Branch is a surname that may refer to:

 Christopher Branch (circa 1600–1682), early American colonist
 Cliff Branch (1948–2019), American football player
 David Branch (fighter) (born 1981), American mixed martial arts fighter
 David Branch (ice hockey) (born 1948), Canadian ice hockey administrator
 Emmett Forest Branch (1874–1932), governor of the U.S. state of Indiana
 Frank Branch (born 1944), Canadian politician 
 Graham Branch (born 1972), English footballer
 John Branch Jr. (1782–1863), U.S. Senator, Secretary of the Navy, governor of North Carolina, and territorial governor of Florida
 Lawrence O'Bryan Branch (1820–1862), Confederate General and Representative from North Carolina
 Michael Branch (academic) (born 1940), British linguist
 Michael Branch (footballer) (born 1978), English footballer
 Mike Branch (born 1965), American politician
 Michelle Branch (born 1983), American singer, songwriter and guitarist
 Oliver Ernesto Branch (1847–1916), American politician
 Oliver Winslow Branch (1879–1956), associate justice of the New Hampshire Supreme Court
 Pamela Branch (1920–1967), British crime novelist
 Thomas H. Branch (1856-1924), American Seventh-day Adventist missionary
 Vanessa Branch (born 1973), British actress and model
 William B. Branch (1927-2019), American playwright
 William Roy Branch (1946–2018), British herpetologist
 Winston Branch (born 1947), British artist, originally from Saint Lucia

See also
 Justice Branch (disambiguation)
 Branch (disambiguation)
 Branche, a surname